Geologic timeline can refer to:

The geologic time scale of Earth history.
The historical development of the science of geology, as in the timeline of geology article.